John Albin Pettersson (11 September 1886 – 12 October 1951) was a Swedish football chairman and manager.

Career
In 1910, at the age of 22, Pettersson became chairman of Helsingborgs IF, a post he held until his death in 1951. In 1917, Pettersson joined the board of the Swedish Football Association, becoming chairman in 1921. As a result of his chairmanship of the Swedish Football Association, Pettersson also became de facto manager of Sweden, managing 138 games over the course of 15 years. Whilst in his role at the Swedish Football Association, Pettersson was also instrumental in the formation of the Allsvenskan.

Additionally, Pettersson worked as a sports journalist at Dagens Nyheter and Helsingborgs Dagblad during his career.

In 2014, Pettersson was added to the Swedish Football Hall of Fame.

Managerial statistics

References

Sportspeople from Halmstad
1886 births
1951 deaths
Swedish football chairmen and investors
Sweden national football team managers
Swedish football managers
Chairmen of the Swedish Football Association
Helsingborgs IF non-playing staff
Swedish sports journalists